Charlos Gary (born September 14, 1968) is an American cartoonist and comic strip author, best known for creating a series entitled Working It Out, a strip that deals with office politics in a format similar to Dilbert.

Biography 
Charlos Gary was born in Boynton Beach (near West Palm Beach) and reared in Orlando, Florida. He is African-American. The middle child in a family of seven, Gary discovered an aptitude for art at an early age and pursued it as a career field while studying at Ohio State University, and later at the University of Toledo.

His first semi-professional gig came at Ohio State, with a short-lived comic strip called State U. After graduating from Toledo, he began working as a graphic designer for various newspapers, often submitting his own political cartoons for publication. In early 2001, as an editorial artist for the Chicago Tribune, Gary created his signature strip Working It Out.

Creative works 
Charlos Gary has published two comic strips and a web log; he published his first book in 2006.  His two comic strips, Working It Out (2001 to present) and Café Con Leche (2007-2014), are syndicated by Creators Syndicate.

Bibliography 
In 2006, Gary published his Working It Out comics in a book titled It's Always a Great Day to Be the Boss.

Working It Out 
, Working It Out currently runs in about 50 newspapers across the United States, typically in the business and financial sections.

The comic strip centers around a character named "Mr. Jamison" – a bushy-moustached, pencil-nosed low-level manager who seems to take delight in the suffering and mistreatment of his subordinates. Mr. Jamison frequently goes on a “power trip” over the most trivial of issues and often refers to his employees as “peons”. The overall theme is a workplace tug-of-war that pits the weasel-like management staff against the water-cooler backstabbing of their hard(-ly) working, expendable employees.

Café Con Leche 
Gary launched his newly syndicated comic strip, called Café Con Leche, in April 2007. Café Con Leche is about an interracial couple getting to know each other's cultural background. The strip ended November 2, 2014.

Web log 
Gary is an active blogger, commenting on topics of the day, with focus on minority issues in American society.

References

External links
Working It Out at Creators Syndicate
Cafe Con Leche at Creators Syndicate

1968 births
Living people
African-American comics creators
American comics creators
American comic strip cartoonists
Chicago Tribune people
Ohio State University alumni
University of Toledo alumni
American bloggers
People from Boynton Beach, Florida
21st-century African-American writers
20th-century African-American people